Zannichellia obtusifolia is a plant found in fresh to brackish waters in the Mediterranean.

References

Potamogetonaceae
Plants described in 1986